Pablo Ezequiel Calderón (born 13 May 1998) is an Argentine professional footballer who plays as a centre-back for Unión Santa Fe.

Career
Calderón, alongside his brother, joined the youth system of Unión Santa Fe from Cooperativista in 2015 following a successful trial. They had previously played in the ranks of Charata Juniors. Four years later, in 2019, he was released by the club. Calderón subsequently headed to Costa Rican football with Liga FPD side Jicaral. He made his senior and professional debut on 19 September 2019 in an away win against Cartaginés. Fifteen further appearances followed across 2019–20. In August 2020, after leaving Jicaral, Calderón rejoined Argentine Primera División outfit Unión Santa Fe; penning a two-year contract.

Personal life
Calderón is the twin brother of fellow professional footballer Franco Calderón.

Career statistics
.

References

External links

1998 births
Living people
Sportspeople from Chaco Province
Argentine footballers
Association football defenders
Argentine expatriate footballers
Expatriate footballers in Costa Rica
Argentine expatriate sportspeople in Costa Rica
Liga FPD players
A.D.R. Jicaral players
Unión de Santa Fe footballers